Russell Bluff is an ice-free bluff at the east side of the mouth of Errant Glacier, at the juncture with Nimrod Glacier. Mapped by the United States Geological Survey (USGS) from tellurometer surveys and Navy air photos, 1960–62. Named by Advisory Committee on Antarctic Names (US-ACAN) for John Russell, United States Antarctic Research Program (USARP) traverse specialist at McMurdo Sound, 1959.
 

Cliffs of the Ross Dependency
Shackleton Coast